Lincoln Township is a township in Kossuth County, Iowa, United States.

History
Lincoln Township was created in 1893.

References

Townships in Kossuth County, Iowa
Townships in Iowa
1893 establishments in Iowa
Populated places established in 1893